Nivetha Pethuraj (born 30 November 1991) is an Indian actress who appears in Telugu and Tamil films. She made her acting debut with the Tamil film Oru Naal Koothu (2016). She then made her Telugu debut with Mental Madhilo (2017) and received SIIMA Award for Best Female Debut – Telugu nomination. 

Pethuraj has been part of successful films including Podhuvaga En Manasu Thangam (2017), Tik Tik Tik (2018), Chitralahari (2019), Brochevarevarura (2019), Ala Vaikunthapurramuloo (2020), Red and Paagal both (2021). She received SIIMA Award for Best Supporting Actress – Telugu nomination for her performance in Chitralahari and Red.

Early life and work 
Nivetha Pethuraj was born 30 November 1991 in Madurai, Tamil Nadu. Her father has a mixed Tamil and Telugu ancestry while her mother is Tamil. Immediately after her birth, her family moved to Kovilpatti, where she did her early schooling. At the age of 11, she moved to Dubai along with her parents and studied in Crescent English High School. She lived in Dubai for about 10 years. She obtained her management degree from Heriot-Watt University, Edinburgh.

Pethuraj became Miss India UAE in 2015 and participated in Miss India Worldwide 2015, where she became a finalist and ended in top 5.

Her interests include racing. She is the second celebrity from Tamil cinema to join the formula car race after actor Thala Ajith Kumar.

Career

Debut and early work (2016-2020) 
Pethuraj made her acting debut with the Tamil film Oru Naal Koothu in 2016. She portrayed an IT professional opposite Dinesh. Hindustan Times termed her performance "engaging". Times of India noted, "Nivetha is impressive in her debut."

In 2017, she had two films. She first appeared in Podhuvaga Emmanasu Thangam opposite Udhayanidhi Stalin. Deccan Chronicle said, "Nivetha Pethuraj looks good, but hardly makes an impact in a poorly etched character." She then made her Telugu debut with Mental Madhilo. She portrayed a straight forward girl opposite Sree Vishnu, a successful venture. Firstpost noted, "A terrific actress, Nivetha Pethuraj easily gives one of the best performances of the year. She becomes the voice of reason in the film and anchors the whole film with her verve."

Pethuraj had 2 releases in 2018. She first portrayed an army official alongside Jayam Ravi in Tik Tik Tik. It was a commercial success at the box office. Hindustan Times said, "Nivetha Pethuraj as Captain Swathi is one positive in the film". She next appeared as a Sub-Inspector opposite Vijay Antony in Thimiru Pudichavan. Cinema Express said, "Nivetha Pethuraj pulls off the Madras slang and seems to handle comedy well." Her next film Party, despite having completed filming, remains unreleased.

Prthuraj had 3 releases in 2019. She portrayed a corporate executive alongside Sai Dharam Tej in Chitralahari, a commercial success. Deccan Chronicle said that she "performs well" among the two female leads. Times of India stated, "Nivetha Pethuraj plays her unapologetic stone-cold corporate honcho role with perfection."

she had signed the Tamil film Sangathamizhan starring Vijay Sethupathi directed by Vijay Chander, which opened to mixed reviews from critics.

In 2021, Nivetha appeared in Red, directed by Kishore Tirumala, co-starring Ram Pothineni, Malvika Sharma, and Amritha Aiyer.

Pradeep Kumar of The Hindu noted, "Nivetha Pethuraj fits the ‘Tamil ponnu’ billing to a T."

Filmography

Films

Awards and nominations

References

External links 
 

Tamil actresses
Telugu actresses
Living people
Actresses in Telugu cinema
Actresses in Tamil cinema
People from Thoothukudi district
21st-century Indian actresses
1991 births
Alumni of Heriot-Watt University